The Leica TL2 is a digital mirrorless interchangeable lens camera  with a Leica L-mount announced by Leica Camera on 10 July 2017.

References

 https://www.dpreview.com/products/leica/slrs/leica_tl2
 https://www.overgaard.dk/Leica-TL-mirrorless-digital-camera-review-and-user-report.html

External links 
 LEICA TL2 ~ A statement

TL2 )
Cameras introduced in 2017